Wahlmanska huset (Wahlman building), also gamla varmbadhuset (former bath) is a building in Hedemora, Sweden, and a listed building since 2010. The house is named after the architect Lars Israel Wahlman, and was built in 1899 as the town's bath. It served as such until 1974, when the swimming- and sports venue Vasahallen was built. Wahlmanska huset was then left to degenerate until 1982, when a restoration was conducted and the building became a gallery for temporary art exhibitions.

References 

Listed buildings in Hedemora Municipality